Harish Uthaman (born 5 April 1982) is an Indian actor who appears in Tamil, Telugu, Malayalam, and Kannada films. He made his début portraying the lead role in Tha (2010), before playing villains in Gouravam, Pandiya Naadu, Meagamann, Power and Srimanthudu. He has acted in short films like Aazh Kadal, Kalaivu, etc. as the Hero and a musical album by Tarang called 'Undone'. His noteworthy performances are cop roles in movies like Thani Oruvan and Dora.

Personal life 
Harish was born in a Malayali family. He is from Kannur. He married Mumbai-based celebrity Makeup Artist Amrita Kalyanpur. Their wedding took place on 6 September 2018 at Guruvayur Temple, Kerala in an intimate traditional ceremony in the presence of friends and family. They got divorced in 2019. In 2022, he married Malayalam actress Chinnu Kuruvila.

Career
Harish's first job was as a part of the cabin crew, working with Paramount Airways for three years and later with British Airways for three further years. He also briefly worked in a commercials company in Chennai before Suriya Prabhakaran, offered him the lead role in a film. Harish thus made his acting début with the low budget 2010 romantic Tamil film Tha, which opened to above average reviews.
To prepare for his first role he grew his beard for five months, and did work to darken his skin by applying oil and sitting in the sunshine as per the role's demands. The film had a limited release and went unnoticed at the box office, and his performance was described as "apt" by critics. The film was later screened at the Tamil Film Festival in Norway, where Harish met Radha Mohan for the first time. Harish won the Best Newcomer Award at the festival. Subsequently, Radha Mohan cast Harish in a negative role in his bilingual film Gouravam (2013).

He was recommended to the director Suseenthiran for a role in Pandiya Naadu (2013) by Suriya Prabhakaran, his first director, and went on to gain critical acclaim for his performance in a villainous role. Today he does a lot of character and cop roles with all leading stars of south Indian industry. In the movie Nenjil Thunivirundhal (2017) he transformed his looks to suit the character. His movie Naandhi (2021) got huge response and his negative role got compliments like "We really Hate You" .

Filmography

Films

Web series

Television 
2008-2009 Kolangal from episode 1329 - Madhubalakrishnan "Madhu" - Musician (Menaka's Lover) - Tamil

Voice actor

References

External links
 

Indian male film actors
Male actors in Tamil cinema
Living people
Male actors in Telugu cinema
1982 births
People from Coimbatore
Male actors in Malayalam cinema